Major Vivek Gupta MVC (2 January 1970 – 13 June 1999) was an officer in the Indian Army. He was posthumously conferred the Maha Vir Chakra, India's second highest war-time military honour, for his actions during the 1999 Kargil War (Operation Vijay).

He belonged to the second battalion of the Rajputana Rifles, also known as 2 Raj Rif. He was also awarded the Chief of Army Staff (COAS) commendation card during his service.

Biography
Vivek Gupta was born on January 2, 1970, in Deharadun, Uttarakhand, to Lieutenant Colonel BRS Gupta.

Vivek joined the National Defense Academy and the Indian Military Academy after graduation. He was commissioned into the Rajputana Rifles Regiment, an infantry regiment famed for its brave warriors, on June 13, 1992.

In 1997, Major Vivek married army officer Capt Rajshree Bisht. He was a courageous and dedicated soldier who received the Chief of Army Staff (COAS) commendation card. Recognizing his exceptional abilities, he was quickly assigned to Infantry School, Mhow, as a weapon instructor.

Later, in 1999, he participated in the Kargil War, when he was killed in action and received the Maha Vir Chakra.

Kargil War: June 1999

During the Kargil war in 1999, Major Vivek Gupta was instrumental in capturing the Tololing peak. The 2nd Rajputana Rifles entered the war when the Indian army lacked sufficientinformation about the scope of the invasion. Major Gupta and his men from the Rajputana Rifles' 2nd Battalion were tasked with recapturing point 4590 at Tololing in the Drass sector.

This, like so many later operations in Kargil, was a dangerous mission that required an uphill accent toward the entrenched enemy posts with the benefit of vertical position and good vantage point.

Major Vivek was killed in action on June 13, exactly seven years after joining the Rajputana Rifles.

Maha Vir Chakra
Posthumously, he was awarded the Maha Vir Chakra by then President of India, late K. R. Narayanan on 15 August 2000.

In popular culture
 Major Vivek Gupta was portrayed by Bollywood actor Himanshu Malik in the 2003 historical battle film LOC: Kargil.

External links
 https://defencelover.in/major-vivek-gupta-mvcposthumous-who-led-us-to-victory-at-tololing-after-heavy-casualties

References 

Indian Army officers
Recipients of the Maha Vir Chakra
People of the Kargil War
People from Dehradun
1999 deaths
1970 births
Indian military personnel killed in action